Mouse Noses on Toast is a children's book written by Daren King and illustrated by David Roberts, published in 2006. It won the Nestlé Children's Book Prize Gold Award.

Plot summary
A young mouse called Paul is so shocked to learn that "mouse noses on toast" are served at a fancy restaurant that he gathers a ragtag group of activists to investigate and protest.

Reception
Reviewers variously commented that it is a "quick" and "easy" read, and a "nice book to read aloud". The Observer compared its style of humour to The Magic Roundabout and the School Library Journal said it is "just as engaging as it is loopy". Both the School Library Journal and AuthorLink criticised the ending.

AuthorLink called David Roberts' illustrations "cute", and the School Library Journal said that the "very simple pen-and-ink illustrations ... fit the equally pared down narrative".

References

2006 British novels
2006 children's books
British children's novels
Children's fantasy novels
Children's novels about animals
Faber and Faber books